The Secret of Dr. Honigberger is a 1940 novella by the Romanian writer Mircea Eliade. It centres on the search for a 19th-century physician named Johann Martin Honigberger, who disappeared in India while searching for the invisible kingdom Shambhala, as well as his early 20th-century biographer who has also disappeared.

Honigberger was a real person, a physician and ethnographer who travelled in Asia in the 19th century. The novella was first published in Romania in 1940 together with Eliade's novella Nights at Serampore, which also revolves around India and has similar supernatural elements. The two novellas were translated into English by William Ames Coates and published in 1970 as Two Tales of the Occult, and in 1986 as Two Strange Tales. A translation by Ana Cartianu was published in 1992 under the title Doctor Honigberger's Secret, as part of the Eliade omnibus volume Mystic Stories.

See also
 1940 in literature
 Romanian literature

References

1940 fantasy novels
Romanian novellas
Romanian novels
Works by Mircea Eliade
Novels set in India